The 1st South Asian Beach Games was held in Hambantota, Sri Lanka between 8 and 14 October 2011. The opening ceremony was held at the Hambantota Beach Stadium, located in Hambantota district. 359 athletes from eight South Asian nations were competed.

Host city selection
Sri Lankan bid for Hambantota was selected over bids of Bangladesh and the Maldives by the South Asian National Olympic Committees in a unanimous decision.

Logo and the Mascot
The logo was launched on 20 January 2011 in Galle. The Mascot represents a character called "Salu Paaliya" which is one of the 12 Palis. Palis are characters which represents various dance forms. It is believed that the "Salu Paaliya" has comical actions and the power to heal which is ideal for the Beach Games as the Mascot.

Sports
Marathon swimming and sailing were to be contested in Arugam Bay while the remaining sports were contested in Hambantota. However, later organizers decided to move the events closer locations, Tangalle and Tissamaharama. 26 events in 10 sports were held. Triathlon and beach bodybuilding were dropped from the program due to a lack of participants.

  3-on-3 basketball(2) 
  Beach football (1)
  Beach handball (1)
  Beach kabbadi (2)
  Beach netball (1)
  Beach Volleyball  (2)
  Marathon swimming (2)
  Lifesaving (6)
  Tent pegging (8)
  Windsurfing (1)

Participating nations

A total of eight countries participated at the 2011 South Asian Beach Games.

 (19)
 (4)
 (90)
 (56)
 (36)
 (56)
 (110)

Schedule
This is the schedule of events for the 2011 South Asian Beach Games.

Medal table

References

External links

 
2011 in multi-sport events
South Asian Games, 2011, Beach
2011 in Sri Lankan sport
2011, Beach
2011 in Asian sport
Multi-sport events in Sri Lanka
Hambantota
Beach sports competitions